Sainte-Alvère-Saint-Laurent Les Bâtons was a short-lived commune in the department of Dordogne, southwestern France. The commune was established on 1 January 2016 by merger of the former communes of Sainte-Alvère and Saint-Laurent-des-Bâtons. On 1 January 2017, it was merged into the new commune Val de Louyre et Caudeau.

See also 
Communes of the Dordogne department

References 

Former communes of Dordogne
Populated places established in 2016
2016 establishments in France
Populated places disestablished in 2017
2017 disestablishments in France